An annular solar eclipse will occur on Wednesday, January 26, 2028. A solar eclipse occurs when the Moon passes between Earth and the Sun, thereby totally or partly obscuring the image of the Sun for a viewer on Earth. An annular solar eclipse occurs when the Moon's apparent diameter is smaller than the Sun's, blocking most of the Sun's light and causing the Sun to look like an annulus (ring). An annular eclipse appears as a partial eclipse over a region of the Earth thousands of kilometres wide.

Images

Related eclipses

Eclipses in 2028
 A partial lunar eclipse on Wednesday, 12 January 2028.
 An annular solar eclipse on Wednesday, 26 January 2028.
 A partial lunar eclipse on Thursday, 6 July 2028.
 A total solar eclipse on Saturday, 22 July 2028.
 A total lunar eclipse on Sunday, 31 December 2028.

Solar eclipses of 2026–2029

Saros 141

Metonic series

References

External links 

2028 1 26
2028 in science
2028 01 26
2028 01 26